California State University, Fresno (Fresno State) is a public university in Fresno, California. It is part of the California State University system. The university had a fall 2020 enrollment of 25,341 students.  It offers 60 bachelor's degree program, 45 master's degree programs, 3 doctoral degree programs, 12 certificates of advanced study, and 2 different teaching credentials. The university is classified among "R2: Doctoral Universities – High research activity". Fresno is an Hispanic-serving institution (HSI) and is eligible to be designated as an Asian American Native American Pacific Islander serving institution (AANAPISI).

The university's facilities include an on-campus planetarium, on-campus raisin and wine grape vineyards, and a commercial winery where student-made wines have won over 300 awards since 1997. Members of Fresno State's nationally-ranked equestrian team have the option of housing their horses on campus, next to indoor and outdoor arenas. Fresno State has a  Student Recreation Center and the third-largest library (by square footage) in the California State University system.

History
California State University, Fresno was founded as the Fresno State Normal School in 1911 with Charles Lourie McLane as its first president. The original campus was what is now Fresno City College. 
In 1956, Fresno State moved its campus to its present location in the northeast part of the city; FCC bought the old campus and moved back in. It became Fresno State College in 1949, when it was authorized to grant bachelor's degrees. It became a charter institution of the State College System of California, forerunner of the California State University System, in 1961. In 1972, the name was officially changed to California State University, Fresno.

Even after changing its official name to "California State University, Fresno," the school has long been called "Fresno State" for short, particularly in athletics. The two names are officially interchangeable; both are accepted on first reference in news stories.

Campus
The greater campus extends from Valley Children's Stadium on the west boundary to Highway 168 on the east side. The University Agricultural Laboratory designates the northern boundary of the campus, while Shaw Avenue designates the southern edge.

The  main campus features more than 46 traditional and modern buildings. The 1,011 acre University Agricultural Laboratory (The "Farm") is used for agronomic and horticulture crops, equine, swine, beef, dairy, poultry, and sheep units, as well as several hundred acres of cattle rangeland. Fresno State was officially designated as an arboretum in 1979 and now has more than 3,200 trees on campus. Fresno State operates the first university-based commercial winery in the United States.

Fresno State Library

The Fresno State Library is a main resource for recorded knowledge and information supporting the teaching, research, and service functions of Fresno State. Because of its size and depth, it is an important community and regional resource and a key part of the institution's role as a regional university.

The library recently underwent a $105 million renovation that was completed in February 2009. The library held its grand opening on February 19, 2009 and is now home to a variety of book collections. The library houses 1,000,000 books in its . The library is home to the largest installation of compact shelving on any single floor in the United States. It is currently the third largest library in the CSU system (in terms of square footage), and among the top ten largest in the CSU system based on the number of volumes. It also is the largest academic building on the Fresno State campus. The five-story building features seating areas for almost 4,000 people, group study rooms, wireless access and a Starbucks.

Public computers are available. Student, faculty and staff have access to over 200 wireless laptops, a media production lab for editing digital video and audio, and an instruction and collaboration center (Studio 2) for teaching information literacy skills. Reference assistance can be accessed by telephone, e-mail, instant messaging, text messaging, and in-person in the Library.

The Fresno State Library features a number of special collections such as the Arne Nixon Center, a research center for the study of children's and young adult literature, and the Central Valley Political Archive.

Michael Gorman, the former dean of the Library, was the President of the American Library Association in 2005–2006. As of 2017, Delritta Hornbuckle is the Library's Dean.

Campus gallery

Academics

Fresno State was the first of all 23 CSU campuses to offer an individual-campus doctorate. At the graduate level, Fresno State also offers the following nationally ranked programs: part-time MBA, Physical Therapy, Nursing, Speech-Language Pathology, and Social Work.

A joint doctoral program in collaboration with San Jose State University for a Doctor of Nursing Practice (DNP) degree is administered through Fresno State.

In May 2019, the university saw the largest graduating class in its history, with over 6,200 graduates.

Accreditation

California State University, Fresno is accredited by the WASC Senior College and University Commission. The five engineering programs in the Lyles College of Engineering are each accredited by the Engineering Accreditation Commission of ABET. The Craig School of Business is AACSB accredited. The university is classified by the U.S. Federal government as an Asian American Native American Pacific Islander-Serving Institution (AANAPISI), and a Hispanic-serving institution (HSI) because the Hispanic undergraduate full-time-equivalent student enrollment is greater than 25%.

Schools and colleges

 Jordan College of Agricultural Sciences and Technology
 College of Arts and Humanities
 Craig School of Business
 Kremen School of Education and Human Development
 Lyles College of Engineering
 College of Health and Human Services
 College of Science and Mathematics
 College of Social Sciences

Smittcamp Family Honors College
The Smittcamp Family Honors College is a program providing top high school graduates a fully paid President's Scholarship, which includes tuition and housing, as well as other amenities for the duration of their studies.

Admission to the Smittcamp Family Honors College is highly competitive and candidates must exceed one or more of the following: have a minimum 3.8 GPA, rank in the top 10% of their high school graduating class, have a combined SAT score of 1200 or an average ACT English and Mathematics score of 27.

Smittcamp Honors Scholars must also complete rigorous academic and community service requirements. International study abroad programs are available. Smittcamp Honors College students receive priority registration for all courses, regular interaction with the university president, and special honors recognition at commencement. The Honors College is named after longtime campus friends and philanthropists Earl and Muriel Smittcamp.

Rankings

 In its 2022 rankings, Forbes ranked Fresno State the 170th best university in the nation in its America's Top Colleges rankings 
 In its 2022 rankings, U.S. News & World Report ranked Fresno State 250th out of 443 U.S. national universities and tied for 124th in its ranking of 227 "Top Public Schools". 
 In its 2022 rankings, U.S. News & World Report also ranked Fresno State tied for 30th in "Top Performers on Social Mobility" among national universities and tied for 49th in the nation in its "Best Undergraduate Engineering Programs" at schools where doctorates are not offered.
 Money magazine ranked Fresno State 62nd in the country out of 739 schools evaluated for its 2020 "Best Colleges for Your Money" edition and 40th in its list of the 50 best public schools in the U.S.
 In 2022, Washington Monthly ranked Fresno State 36th out of 442 schools on its National Universities list. Washington Monthly assesses the quality of schools based on social mobility, research, and promoting public service.
 In 2022, Forbes magazine's "America's Top Colleges" list ranked Fresno State 170th out of 465 universities, liberal arts colleges, and service academies nationwide.
 In 2017, U.S. News & World Report ranked Fresno State first in the nation in its list of best public universities in graduation rate performances.

Student life

Student Involvement Center 
The Student Involvement Center provides services, programs and co-curricular educational activities that give student the opportunity to develop skills and expand their knowledge. Their core purpose is to promote engagement and cultivate student growth through support and teamwork, service, growth and learning, leadership and inclusion. Some key events the Student Involvement Center plan are Convocation, Homecoming Week, Vintage Days, Commencement, and more.

Fraternity and sorority life 

 Fraternities and sororities has been part of Fresno State for 89 years and includes 420 single-sex fraternities and sororities consisting of over 1,420 men and women. The Student Involvement Center is charged with advising the four Greek Councils at Fresno State:  the Interfraternity Council (IFC), the Panhellenic Association (PHA), the National Pan-Hellenic Council (NPHC), and the United Sorority & Fraternity Council (USFC). Councils are provided support in the areas of programming, council management, leadership development, membership recruitment, policy interpretation, scholastic achievement, and public relations. Chapter directory can be found here.

Student clubs and organizations

Student clubs and organizations are groups that have been recognized by the university. Clubs and organizations can be based on academic, cultural, recreational, religious or other special interests. These groups are required to apply for recognition to receive support from the university.

Associated Students, Inc. (ASI)
ASI is the recognized student body government at Fresno State. Through ASI, students participate in the governance of the university through fostering awareness of student opinions on campus issues and assisting in the protection of student rights. Twenty students are elected each year. There are four executives who include a President, Vice President, Vice President of Finance, and a Vice President of External Affairs, ten at-large senators and eight college senators. Those elected serve annual terms from June 1 to May 31.

ASI provides funding for student-related projects on campus. Sponsored Activities Funding provides supplemental event funding for recognized student clubs and organizations. The Instructionally Related Activity (IRA) fund provides funding for activities and laboratory experiences that are partially sponsored by an academic program, discipline, or department. Grants provide financial support for graduate and undergraduate student research, projects, and other scholarly endeavors in all academic disciplines.

Student Recreation Center

In February 2006, the Student Recreation Center opened. Construction costs were paid for and operating funds are derived from a semester student-use fee. While an Association entity, the Student Recreation Center is under the direction of the Division of Student Affairs. The Student Recreation Center is adjacent to the Save Mart Center arena.

Any student who has paid the USU student-use fee in the current semester is eligible to use the Recreation Center. Faculty and staff may join at a monthly rate. This facility is not available to the general public.

The center has four full-size basketball courts, a dance studio, a 1/8 mile (200 m) indoor running track, locker rooms, 2 racquetball courts, aerobic equipment, and weight-lifting machines. Services include personal training, group fitness classes, towel service and personal lockers.

University Student Union
In late 2018, students voted in construction of a new student union.  Construction is slated to begin in early 2020 and end in 2021.  The new student union will be built to accommodate a campus of around 25,000 students.  The new union will feature "new retail dining concepts, a large, multi-purpose ballroom, space for student clubs and organizations, offices for Associated Students, Inc. and Student Involvement, and many other needed programmatic spaces."  A fee of $149 will be included in students tuition costs once the faculty opens to repay its construction costs.

The original student union was constructed on November 11, 1968 and was built to accommodate a campus of 10,000 students.  The building is 52,000 square feet and has three levels, one of which is underground.

Student housing – University Courtyard
Home to 1,100 students, University Courtyard consists of nine housing communities of both suite and community style living. Fresno State's classrooms, library, computer lab, student activities, athletic facilities, theater, Save Mart Center, Student Recreation Center and health center are all within walking distance of the residence halls.

University Courtyard offers a computer lab and an outdoor swimming pool. The Courtyard has lighted parking, an electronic room and hall lock system, gated bicycle racks and campus escorts. During the fall and spring, all halls have live-in staff available 24 hours/7 days a week.

Athletics

Fresno State is a member of the NCAA Division I Mountain West Conference. The university's 22 varsity sports teams are known as the Bulldogs, and the school's colors are cardinal red and blue. Fresno State has made several runs at NCAA tournaments in basketball, football, soccer, tennis, baseball, softball, and volleyball.

In 2017, Fresno State resurrected its wrestling program after an 11-year hiatus. Fresno State wrestling competes in the Big 12 Conference. The Fresno State–San Diego State football rivalry is an American college football rivalry between the Fresno State Bulldogs football team of Fresno and San Diego State Aztecs football team of San Diego State University. The winner of the game receives the "Old Oil Can" trophy.

The Bulldogs have earned the following NCAA Division I National Championships:
 NCAA Division I National Champions, baseball, in 2008
 NCAA Division I National Champions, softball, in 1998.

Media
FresnoStateNews is an online source of information about current events affecting Fresno State students, faculty and staff. The site provides an archive of news articles, videos and photos, as well as links to major resources on campus.

The FresnoState Magazine is published twice per year from the Office of University Communications. It is both a print and online publication that features current events at Fresno State, Alumni Association events and alumni achievements.

The Collegian is the campus student-run newspaper. It is published during the fall and spring semesters on Monday, Wednesday and Friday. The online edition features video, podcasts and photo galleries.

KFSR Radio is the campus radio station.  KFSR's broadcast license is owned by California State University, Fresno.  KFSR is a listener-supported, non-profit, public radio station.  It broadcasts at 90.7 FM and streams online at www.kfsr.org.  It operates 24 hours a day, 365 days a year, and plays jazz, blues and a wide range of specialty shows.

Fresno State Focus is the campus student-run, weekly broadcast put on by the Media, Communications, and Journalism department. The news team changes each semester, and has been involved in several projects that extend beyond the campus.

ROTC
Two branches of the military are represented on campus at Fresno State: Army and Air Force. The Army unit on campus is known as the Bulldog Battalion. The Air Force ROTC Detachment on campus, Detachment 35, is one of the oldest in the nation. Founded in 1948, only one year after the signing of the National Defense Act of 1947 which established the U.S. Air Force as a separate branch of the military, Detachment 35 has won numerous awards. In July 2008, Detachment 35 was awarded the "High Flight" award, naming it the top mid-sized detachment in the entire southwest region of the United States. Just a few months later, Detachment 35 was named best mid-sized detachment in the nation and awarded the "Right of Line" award, the highest honor for a detachment.

Alumni

A number of notable Fresno State alumni have served in state and federal positions, become major athletes, or found their mark in business and media, including Paul George, basketball athlete and Joy Covey, the original CFO of Amazon.com.

Notes

References

External links

 
 Fresno State Athletics website
 "Interim Committee of Twenty-Five of the California Conference on Government and Taxation--Report on The Fresno State College (Report No. 56)," September 13, 1937

 
Fresno
California State University, Fresno
Universities and colleges in Fresno County, California
Schools accredited by the Western Association of Schools and Colleges
Educational institutions established in 1911
Tourist attractions in Fresno, California
1911 establishments in California